Megoura viciae  is a large, green aphid in the family Aphididae native to Europe that feeds on plants in the genus Vicia.  They are commonly known as vetch aphids for this reason.

Taxonomy
Megoura viciae was described by English entomologist George Bowdler Buckton in 1876. It is the type species of the genus Megoura.

Morphology
Megoura viciae has a large globular green abdomen with a smaller black prothorax, black cauda, black legs, black antennae and a black head. Towards the rear of the body are large crescent-shaped black sclerites which are in front of the siphunculi. The eyes are red in colour. Dependent on the stage in their lifecycle M. viciae  may be winged or wingless.

Distribution and habitat
Megoura viciae  is widely present in Europe, from latitudes 64–65° N across Scandinavia, into Denmark and the rest of Europe (including England) and south to the Mediterranean. It also occurs in Ethiopia and has been recorded from North America.

Host plants
Megoura viciae feeds on leguminous plants, primarily vetch, peas and broad beans of the genus Vicia from which M. viciae gets its common name of vetch aphids. Feeding on the host plant causes a leaf gall to form.

Life cycle
Megoura viciae does not move between primary and secondary plants, spending its life cycle on a leguminous host plant. Eggs are laid at the base of the host plant and these hatch in the spring. Winged forms are produced after three generations and these winged aphids then move on to other plants. In the autumn the aphids move on to the seed pods of the host plant.
Like most aphids, M. viciae is viviparous.

References

External links
 

Macrosiphini
Hemiptera of Africa
Hemiptera of Europe
Hemiptera of North America
Insects described in 1876